Rick Zuijderwijk (born 13 April 2001) is a Dutch professional footballer who plays as a midfielder. A free agent, he most recently played for Willem II.

Club career
Zuijderwijk joined the Willem II academy in 2010. He made his professional debut with Willem II in a 2–0 Eredivisie loss to SBV Vitesse on 10 August 2019.

On 31 August 2021, he joined FC Den Bosch on loan for the 2021–22 season. In January 2022 he returned to Willem II.

Zuijderwijk's contract with Willem II was terminated by mutual consent on 31 August 2022, making him a free agent.

References

External links
 

2001 births
Living people
Footballers from Breda
Dutch footballers
Association football midfielders
Willem II (football club) players
FC Den Bosch players
Eredivisie players
Eerste Divisie players
21st-century Dutch people